Moroder is a germanised version of the Ladin surname Mureda.

Moroder ([moˈrodɐr]) is a surname from Val Gardena (province of Bolzano), present almost exclusively in Ortisei. The migrations, which began as early as the eighteenth century, within a vast network of trade operated by the inhabitants of Val Gardena, have also distributed the surname elsewhere in Italy (Bolzano, Ancona, Pordenone) and abroad in Valencia and Lyon, and subsequently in Austria, Germany, Santiago de Chile, and the United States.

The Moroders of Ortisei, of which there are several branches distinct from the "farm" or "house of origin" (Costamula, Lenert, Lusenberg, Resciesa, Doss, Cialian), are traditionally known as a family of wood carvers.

Notable people with the name include:

People 
 Josef Moroder-Lusenberg (18461939), Austrian-Italian painter and sculptor
 Franz Moroder (1847-1920), Austrian politician and poet
 Johann Baptist Moroder (18701932), Austrian sculptor
 Rudolf Moroder-Lenèrt (18771914), Tyrolean religious artist
 Ludwig Moroder "Lenert" (18791953), Italian sculptor and teacher
 Friedrich (Rico) Moroder (18801937), Austrian sculptor
 Adele Moroder (18871966), Austrian author
 Otto Moroder (18941977), Austrian sculptor
 Albin Moroder (19222007), Austrian sculptor
 Alex Moroder (19232006), Italian activist
 David Moroder (born 1931), Italian luger and woodcarver
 Luis Moroder (born 1940), Chemist
 Giorgio Moroder (born 1940), Italian musician
 Ulrich Moroder (born 1948), South Tyrolean artist
 Egon Rusina Moroder (born 1949) Italian painter and illustrator 
 Walter Moroder (born 1963), South Tyrolean sculptor
 Petra Moroder (born 1968), Italian freestyle skier
 Karin Moroder (born 1974), Italian cross-country skier, Olympic bronze medal winner
 Daniel Moroder (born 2002), ski jumper

See also 
 Moroder family official website
 Cizeta-Moroder V16T, an Italian sports car 199195
 

Surnames of Italian origin
Rhaeto-Romance surnames
Moroder family